Drury is an unincorporated community in Falls Township, Sumner County, Kansas, United States.  It is located between South Haven and Caldwell near the intersection of S Drury Rd and W 175th St S, next to the Chikaskia River and next to an abandoned railroad.

History
Drury was a station and shipping point on the Kansas Southwestern Railway that previously passed through the community, east to west, from South Haven to Caldwell.

Drury had a post office from 1884 until 1921.

The movie Americana was filmed in Drury.

Education
The community is served by Caldwell USD 360 public school district.

References

Further reading

External links
 Drury Dam in south Sumner County had one colorful history - Sumner News
 Drury Dam Waterfall - Kansas Travel
 Historic Images of Drury - Special Photo Collections at Wichita State University Library
 Sumner County map, KDOT

Unincorporated communities in Sumner County, Kansas
Unincorporated communities in Kansas